Nava Nalanda Mahavihara (NNM) is an institute deemed to be university located in Nalanda, Bihar, India. It was established in 1951 under Rajendra Prasad to revive the ancient seat of learning in Nalanda.

History
Nava Nalanda Mahavihara was founded to develop as a centre of higher studies in Pali and Buddhism along the lines of ancient Nalanda Mahavihara. From the beginning, the Institute functioned as a residential institution, with a limited number of Indian and foreign students. It became a Deemed university  in 2006.

Academics
NNM offers degree, certificate, diploma and research courses in the discipline of Pali, philosophy, ancient history, culture and archaeology, Tibetan studies, Hindi , Sanskrit and more.

Campus 
The present campus of the Mahavihara is some 100 km from the metropolis of Patna, situated on the southern bank of the historical lake Indrapuskarani. Close to the northern bank lie the ruins of the ancient University of Nalanda.

During India's first Global Buddhist Conference in 2021 the Dalai Lama inaugurated two new buildings in the University.

References

External links

Universities and colleges in Bihar
Education in Nalanda district
Nalanda
Deemed universities in India
Educational institutions established in 1951
1951 establishments in Bihar
Buddhist universities and colleges